The College of Coastal Georgia (Coastal Georgia) is a public college in Brunswick, Georgia. It was established in 1961 and opened in 1964, making it one of Georgia's newest state colleges. The college transitioned from a community college into a four-year college and conferred its first baccalaureate degrees on May 7, 2011.

History 
The Board of Regents of the University System of Georgia established the college, originally known as Brunswick College, in 1961 with Brunswick and Glynn County citizens providing a $1 million bond issue for construction of buildings and purchase of land. The college opened in 1964 and shortly after changed its name to Brunswick Junior College in 1965. The college continued expanding the academic facilities on the college's  campus through the late 1960s and 1970s. In 1972 the college added technical programs in addition to the traditional junior college programs and offered both associate programs in higher education and postsecondary technical and adult programs until 2008.

In 1986 the University System of Georgia Board of Regents created the Brunswick Center Consortium composed of Brunswick Junior College, Armstrong State University, and Georgia Southern University. As part of the consortium the two universities provided the college's students with opportunities to begin schooling at the community college and complete education in one of seven bachelor's degree programs and seven graduate degree programs through one of the two universities. In 1988 the college name reverted to Brunswick College after the Board of Regents voted to drop "Junior" from the names of all state two-year colleges.

During the late 1980s and 1990s the college grew into a comprehensive community college, offering over 39 associate degrees, 21 vocational and technical certificate programs. The Board of Regents authorized the creation of the Camden Center location in Kingsland in response to growing populations in expanding population of Camden County. The college transformed the former Kingsland Elementary School into the extension location and opened the facility in January 1993. The center offers general education transfer and vocational/technical programs. In 1996 Brunswick College changed its name to Coastal Georgia Community College. In 2004 the Kingsland location moved into the a new facility in Kingsland and became known as The Camden Center at The Lakes.

Expansion in early 2000s 

In 2008 the college began transitioning from community college to a four-year college when it announced its 10-year strategic plan for the college. The plans include expansion of academic programs and infrastructure to accommodate an enrollment of more than 10,000. In addition to academic and physical expansion the expansion plans include addition student and residence life programs, as well as expanded athletics.  That same year, the vocational and technical programs were transferred to Golden Isles Career Academy in Brunswick, Okefenokee Technical College in Waycross, and Altamaha Technical College in Jesup and the college changed its name to the College of Coastal Georgia. In 2009 the college began offering its first bachelor's degree programs in business administration, early childhood and special education, and middle school education began in fall 2009 and added a bachelor's degree in nursing in 2010. Shortly after the transition to a four-year college began in 2009 College of Coastal Georgia saw a peak enrollment of over 3,000 students.

The Miriam & Hugh Nunnally Health and Science Building opened in early 2011 at a cost of $15.8 million., followed in March 2011, by the announcement that the House Appropriations Committee of Georgia approved $7.6 million for a  classroom and laboratory building, known as the Correll Teacher Education and Learning Center (CTELC). Opened in January 2013, the new building is connected to the Jones Science Building and Academic Commons North and the two older buildings were renovated as part of the project.  CTELC includes space for teacher education classes and is located in close proximity to the Brunswick High School, located just off the campus, allowing education majors access to teaching practicum opportunities and helping to facilitate early college entrance for high school students. The building also has multiple high-tech classrooms for other subjects, and is home to the Office of Service Learning and the Writing Center.

On May 7, 2011, the college conferred the first ever baccalaureate degrees. In July 2011, the college opened the new $12 million student center that includes dining areas, the campus bookstore with a cafe, and a theater; as well as study and recreational areas for students. The college also opened a 352-bed residential building at the cost $14 million, as the college's first student housing structure in August 2011. The three-story building features suite-style dorms with individual bedrooms connected to a common living area.  The opening of CTELC marked an end to the rapid growth on campus.

Campus 

Coastal Georgia's main campus runs north and south, parallel to Altama Avenue. It consists of a pedestrian mall and a large outdoor square in the middle flanked by Mariner Way in the south, College Drive in the north, and a parking lot on the east side of campus. The Health and Science Building and the Gould Memorial Library lie on the south end while the Campus Center and the Academic Commons North on the north end. The most southern building is the Conference Center and the most northern is the Coffin Building and one of the two parking lots. The only buildings on the east side of campus, beyond the other of the two parking lots, are the Student Activity Center and two residence halls.

Brunswick Campus photos

Camden Center 

The Regents authorized a satellite location to serve Camden County residents in 1992 and classes began in the former Kingsland Elementary School in 1993. A new permanent facility, the Camden Center, opened in 2004. The facility is 101,00 square feet contains; a 270 seat auditorium, classroom, and labs. The director of the Camden Center is Joseph Lodmell.

Academics 
The College of Coastal Georgia is accredited by the Southern Association of Colleges and Schools, and has had continuous accreditation since 1967. The college offers various majors and areas of study and confers associate degrees and bachelor's degrees from its four schools:
 School of Arts and Science
 School of Business and Public Management
 School of Education and Teacher Preparation
 School of Nursing and Health Sciences

Athletics 
The Coastal Georgia athletic teams are called the Mariners. The college is a member of the National Association of Intercollegiate Athletics (NAIA), primarily competing in the Sun Conference (formerly known as the Florida Sun Conference (FSC) until after the 2007–08 school year) since the 2017–18 academic year. The Mariners previously competed in the Southern States Athletic Conference (SSAC; formerly known as Georgia–Alabama–Carolina Conference (GACC) until after the 2003–04 school year) from 2012–13 (after becoming a full member of the NAIA following the one-year provisional period) to 2016–17.

Coastal Georgia competes in eight intercollegiate varsity sports: Men's sports include basketball, golf and tennis; while women's sports include basketball, golf, softball, tennis and volleyball.

History
Until 2011 the college competed in the National Junior College Athletic Association (NJCAA) and as a member of the Georgia Collegiate Athletic Association (GCAA). As part of the college's transformation from a two-year junior college to a four-year institution, Coastal Georgia applied for membership in the NAIA after exploring option to join the National Collegiate Athletic Association (NCAA). The college also began expanding athletics in 2010 with the additions of men's and women's golf and tennis for the 2010–2011 academic year, in which both golf programs placed in the top-10 nationally in the NJCAA championship tournament.

Golf
The men's golf program won back-to-back NAIA national championships in 2014 and 2015.

Notable students
Eban Hyams (born 1981), Indian-born Australian professional basketball player

References

External links 

 Official website
 Official athletics website

Public universities and colleges in Georgia (U.S. state)
Buildings and structures in Glynn County, Georgia
Education in Glynn County, Georgia
Education in Camden County, Georgia
Educational institutions established in 1961
1961 establishments in Georgia (U.S. state)
Universities and colleges accredited by the Southern Association of Colleges and Schools
Southern States Athletic Conference